{{DISPLAYTITLE:C19H24O4}}
The molecular formula C19H24O4 (molar mass: 316.39 g/mol, exact mass: 316.1675 u) may refer to:

 DHSA
 Ferujol